The 2007 Hastings Direct International Championships was a women's tennis tournament played on grass courts at the Eastbourne Tennis Centre in Eastbourne in the United Kingdom that was part of Tier II of the 2007 WTA Tour. It was the 33rd edition of the tournament and was held from 16 June through 23 June 2007. Justine Henin won the tournament.

Finals

Singles

 Justine Henin defeated  Amélie Mauresmo 7–5, 6–7(4–7), 7–6(7–2)
It was Henin's 5th title of the year and the 34th of her career.

Doubles

 Lisa Raymond /  Samantha Stosur defeated  Květa Peschke /  Rennae Stubbs 6–7(5–7), 6–4, 6–3
It was Raymond's 5th title of the year and the 69th of her career. It was Stosur's 5th title of the year and the 22nd of her career.

External links 
 WTA Tournament Profile

Hastings Direct International Championships
Eastbourne International
Hastings Direct International Championships
Hastings Direct International Championships
Hastings Direct International Championships